Joël Houssin (born 1953) is a French author of science fiction, fantasy, and crime fiction. Two of his novels have won the Grand Prix de l'Imaginaire. He also wrote the film Dobermann, based on his series of police novels, and created the crime/fantasy TV series "David Nolande". With Josiane Balasko, he wrote the screenplay of the film My Life Is Hell.

Web source

External links
 
 

1953 births
French science fiction writers
French male screenwriters
French screenwriters
Living people
French male novelists